4-nitrocatechol 4-monooxygenase is an enzyme with systematic name 4-nitrocatechol,NAD(P)H:oxygen 4-oxidoreductase (4-hydroxylating, nitrite-forming). This enzyme catalyses the following chemical reaction

 4-nitrocatechol + NAD(P)H + H+ + O2  2-hydroxy-1,4-benzoquinone + nitrite + NAD(P)+ + H2O

4-nitrocatechol 4-monooxygenase contains FAD.

References

External links 
 

EC 1.14.13